Triplostephanus is a genus of sea snails, marine gastropod mollusks in the family Terebridae, the auger snails.

Species
Species within the genus Triplostephanus include:
 † Triplostephanus wilfordi Harzhauser, Raven & Landau, 2018 
Species brought into synonymy
 Triplostephanus elliscrossi (Bratcher, 1979): synonym of Terebra elliscrossi Bratcher, 1979
 Triplostephanus fenestratus (Hinds, 1844): synonym of Terebra fenestrata Hinds, 1844
 Triplostephanus guineensis (Bouchet, 1983): synonym of Terebra guineensis Bouchet, 1983
 Triplostephanus hoaraui (Drivas & Jay, 1988): synonym of Terebra hoaraui (Drivas & Jay, 1988)
 Triplostephanus lima (Deshayes, 1857): synonym of Cinguloterebra lima (Deshayes, 1857)
 Triplostephanus triseriatus (Gray, 1834): synonym of Terebra triseriata Gray, 1834
 Triplostephanus waikikiensis (Pilsbry, 1921): synonym of Terebra waikikiensis Pilsbry, 1921

References

 Terryn Y. (2007). Terebridae: A Collectors Guide. Conchbooks & NaturalArt. 59pp + plates.

External links
 Dall W.H. (1908). Subdivisions of the Terebridae. The Nautilus. 21(11): 124-125
 Fedosov, A. E.; Malcolm, G.; Terryn, Y.; Gorson, J.; Modica, M. V.; Holford, M.; Puillandre, N. (2020). Phylogenetic classification of the family Terebridae (Neogastropoda: Conoidea). Journal of Molluscan Studies

Terebridae